Pōmare II (c. 1782 – December 7, 1821) (fully Tu Tunuieaiteatua Pōmare II or in modern orthography Tū Tū-nui-ʻēʻa-i-te-atua Pōmare II; historically misspelled as Tu Tunuiea'aite-a-tua), was the second king of Tahiti between 1782 and 1821. He was installed by his father Pōmare I at Tarahoi, February 13, 1791. He ruled under regency from 1782 to 1803.

Life 
Initially recognised as supreme sovereign and Ariʻi-maro-ʻura by the ruler of Huahine, he was subsequently forced from Tahiti and took refuge in Moʻorea December 22, 1808, but returned and defeated his enemies at the Battle of Te Feipī, November 11, 1815.
He was thereafter recognised as undisputed king (Te Ariʻi-nui-o-Tahiti) of Tahiti, Moʻorea and its dependencies.

On November 15, 1815, he proclaimed himself King of Tahiti and Moʻorea in the name of the Christian God.

Pōmare II extended his realm to land outside of the Society Islands. He inherited his father's dominion over the Tuamotus and settled many conflicts between the disparate local chieftains in 1817 and 1821. However, his family's rule only extended to the eastern and central portions of the Tuamotus archipelago. In 1819, the king took nominal possession of Raivavae and Tubuai in the Austral Islands, although control was relegated to the local chiefs.

Conversion to Christianity 
Pomare II believed that he lost favor with the god 'Oro, and, aided by the missionary Henry Nott, he began paying more attention to the God of the Christians.

He was baptised May 16, 1819 at the Royal Chapel, Papeʻete – Christianity and the support of English missionaries aided the centralisation of monarchic power.

Three London Missionary Society missionaries, Henry Bicknell, William Henry, and Charles Wilson preached at the baptism of King Pōmare II. Afterwards, "Henry Bicknell stood on the steps of the pulpit, took water from a basin held by William Henry, and poured it" on King Pōmare's head.

Today a majority of 54% of the French Polynesian population belongs to various Protestant churches, especially the Maohi Protestant Church which is the largest and accounts for more than 50% of the population. It traces its origins to Pomare II, the king of Tahiti, who converted from traditional beliefs to the Reformed tradition brought to the islands by the London Missionary Society.

Family 
Pōmare II was married first before March 1797 (betrothed January 1792) to his double first cousin Tetua-nui Taro-vahine, Ariʻi of Vaiari (now Papeari), who died at ʻArue, July 21, 1806. Around 1809, he married two sisters: Teriʻitoʻoterai Teremoemoe and Teriʻitariʻa who were daughters of Tamatoa III, Ariʻi Rahi of Raiatea.

With his second wife Teriʻitoʻoterai Teremoemoe, he had three children:
ʻAimata (28 February 1813 – 17 September 1877), who ruled as Pōmare IV
Teinaiti (21 November 1817 – 20 March 1818), who died young
Teriʻitariʻa (25 June 1820 – 8 January 1827), who ruled as Pōmare III

Death 
Pōmare died of alcohol-related causes at Motu Uta, Papeete, Tahiti on December 7, 1821.

He was succeeded by his son Pōmare III, who reigned 1821–1827.

Ancestry

See also 
Pōmare Dynasty
Kingdom of Tahiti
List of monarchs of Tahiti
List of deaths through alcohol

Notes

References

Bibliography 

Pōmare dynasty
Tahitian monarchs
Modern child monarchs
Protestant monarchs
Converts to Protestantism from pagan religions
French Polynesian Protestants
Pomare II
Pomare II
Alcohol-related deaths in Tahiti